Buzen may refer to:

 Buzen, Fukuoka, a city located in Fukuoka, Japan
 Buzen Province, an old province of Japan in northern Kyushu
 Jeffrey P. Buzen, a computer scientist and businessman